"In My Head" is a song by American singer Jason Derulo, released as the second single from his self-titled debut studio album. It was first released via download on December 10, 2009. The song topped the charts of Australia, Poland, and the United Kingdom and peaked within the top 10 of the charts in several other countries. The song's official remix has a heavier R&B sound and features rapper Nicki Minaj. Derulo performed the song on the ninth season of American Idol.

Background
Derulo has explained that "In My Head" was chosen to be released as the second single from the album to show the other side of his debut album. The song is electro-influenced and has a heavier rock feel than the R&B and electronica-influenced "Whatcha Say". He mentioned that the album displays both sides, so "In My Head" was released to introduce his fans to the electronic side of the record. The official remix features Nicki Minaj and was released on March 11, 2010. The song was initially titled "In My Bed", but Derulo and Kelly changed this to "In My Head" at the last minute.

Chart performance
"In My Head" debuted on the Billboard Hot 100 at number 63 for the week ending December 26, 2009. It has since become Derulo's second song to reach the top 10, peaking at number five. On June 22, 2010, the song certified double platinum by the RIAA. As of April 23, 2014, the single has sold over 3,174,000 digital copies, making it his second single to cross the 3 million mark. In Canada, the song peaked at number two on the Canadian Hot 100 in the issue dated March 13, 2010, becoming Derulo's second top three single in Canada.

In Australia, the song peaked at the top of the ARIA Singles Chart, and was the only song to debut at number one in Australia in 2010. It has been certified 7× Platinum in Australia, making it one of the country's best-selling singles of all time.

In the United Kingdom, "In My Head" debuted at the top of the UK Singles Chart on February 28, 2010 – for the week ending date March 6, 2010 – making it Derulo's first chart-topping song in Britain and second consecutive top 10 hit there. In the same week, "In My Head" also became Derulo's second consecutive chart-topper on the UK R&B Singles Chart. In Ireland, the song debuted and peaked at number three on the Irish Singles Chart on February 25, 2010.

Music video
The music video was filmed in late December 2009 and released on January 23, 2010, via YouTube. The video begins in the parking lot of a convenience store, with Derulo leaning on a car with some friends when he eventually spots the female lead (played by Lala Escarzega) leaving the store. Derulo is staring at her (with his debut single "Whatcha Say" playing in the background), and eventually he goes up and talks to her and starts singing to her. The video is an extensive dancing video with Derulo dancing near the car with the female lead, in the occasional breakaways, and far more extensively with two male dancers during the bridge of the song. The music video occasionally breaks away to Derulo's silhouette dancing in the fog. Eventually the girl he is dreaming about has joined him. In the end it is revealed that the entire music video was all in Derulo's head and the beginning scene is shown again with the female lead exiting the store as she did at the beginning of the video. As with the beginning, "Whatcha Say" is also played in the end. The video was directed by Kai Crawford.

Track listing

 Digital download
 "In My Head" – 3:19

 CD single
 "In My Head" – 3:19
 "In My Head" (Rhythm Remix) – 3:19

 In My Head EP
 "In My Head" (Remix) (featuring Nicki Minaj) – 3:17
 "In My Head" (Klubjumpers Extended) – 5:58
 "In My Head" (Wideboys Club Mix) – 5:19
 "In My Head" (Wideboys Radio Edit) – 3:13

 Promo CD single
 "In My Head" – 3:23
 "In My Head" (Wideboys Radio Edit) – 3:20
 "In My Head" (Wideboys Club) – 5:26
 "In My Head" (Wideboys Dub) – 5:36

 "In My Head" (Klubjumpers) single
 "In My Head" (Klubjumpers) – 3:04

 "In My Head" (Red Top Club Mix) single
 "In My Head" (Red Top Club Mix) – 6:13

 "In My Head" (Wideboys Club Mix) single
 "In My Head" (Wideboys Club Mix) – 5:19

 "In My Head" (Wideboys Radio Edit) single
 "In My Head" (Wideboys Radio Edit) – 3:13

Charts

Weekly charts

Year-end charts

Certifications

Brian Joo version

On March 3, 2010, Korean-American singer Brian Joo released a Korean version of the song. That same day the Korean single for Derulo's original version was also released in Korea. A music video for the song has been recorded. Derulo promoted the song in Korea with Joo on several music show performances. A special Club Remix has also been released and features both Brian Joo and Jason Derulo singing together.

References

2009 singles
Jason Derulo songs
Number-one singles in Australia
Number-one singles in Poland
Number-one singles in Scotland
Song recordings produced by J. R. Rotem
Songs written by J. R. Rotem
Songs written by Claude Kelly
Songs written by Jason Derulo
UK Singles Chart number-one singles
Nicki Minaj songs
2009 songs
Warner Records singles